Alper Narman is a Turkish songwriter. Narman has worked with numerous Turkish pop music artists including Hande Yener, Simge, Ayşe Hatun Önal, Edis, Hadise, İzel and Işın Karaca. In 2000s, he mainly worked together with Fettah Can, and in 2010s he collaborated with Onurr on a number of mutual works.

Songs written and composed by Narman

Songs written by Narman

Notes 
  He wrote these songs under the name Boaz Aldujeli.

References

External links 
 
 

Turkish music arrangers
Turkish songwriters
Year of birth missing (living people)
Living people